"" (If you are with me, I go with joy) is an aria from Gottfried Heinrich Stölzel's opera Diomedes, which was first staged on 16 November 1718. The aria is best known as "," BWV 508, a version for voice and continuo found as No. 25 in the 1725 Notebook for Anna Magdalena Bach.

History
Gottfried Heinrich Stölzel's opera Diomedes was staged in Bayreuth in November 1718. There has been some speculation how one of its arias, "," came to be known in the Bach household in mid-1730s Leipzig, when Anna Magdalena Bach, Johann Sebastian's second wife, copied an arrangement of the aria into her second notebook. 21st-century scholarship has shown that from the 1720s to the mid 1730s, at least several dozen to perhaps over a hundred of Stölzel's compositions were adopted by Bach or his family members in their public and private music practices. Only indirect evidence suggests how such music was transferred from Stölzel to the Bachs; Bach and Stölzel were in the same places at different times, and shared acquaintances, but whether they met in person can only be surmised.

1707–1732

From 1707 to 1710 Stölzel was a student at Leipzig University. At that time, Melchior Hoffmann was conductor of the Collegium Musicum founded by Telemann, which had Johann Georg Pisendel as its concert master. Stölzel, eager to cultivate his interest in music, visited such venues of Leipzig's high-quality music life. Eventually he became an assistant of Hoffmann, initially as copyist, and later, shortly before leaving Leipzig, he saw his first compositions performed under Hoffmann's direction.

Bach visited the court at Gotha in 1711 and 1717. In 1711 he had been hired as performer on the organ, and during the second of these documented visits he performed his so-called  during Holy Week. Stölzel moved to Bayreuth in 1717, where he was appointed to write church music for the second centenary of Reformation Day (31 October). For the 39th birthday of George William, Margrave of Brandenburg-Bayreuth (16 November) he composed a theatrical serenata, Der Liebe Sieges- und Friedes-Palmen. Before moving to Gotha the next year, where he would remain for the rest of his life, Stölzel still composed one further birthday serenata for the Margrave in Bayreuth.

In 1720, three years before he became  in Leipzig, Johann Sebastian Bach started the Klavierbüchlein (keyboard-booklet) for his eldest son Wilhelm Friedemann. Some years later Wilhelm Friedemann copied a four-movement keyboard suite by Stölzel in this notebook, to which his father added a trio (BWV 929). In 1725 Johann Sebastian started the second notebook for his second wife Anna Magdalena. In the meantime he had assumed his position of cantor and music director in Leipzig: among many responsibilities that came with that title, he was now in charge of the music in the New Church. From 1729 he also became director of the Collegium Musicum founded by Telemann.

Meanwhile, in Gotha, Stölzel had presented his first Passion oratorio, Ein Lämmlein geht und trägt die Schuld, in Holy Week of 1720, and composed a new cantata cycle every few years, among which:
 in the early 1720s a setting of Benjamin Schmolck's String-Music cantata libretto cycle.
 for the 1731–32 liturgical year, a setting of Schmolck's Namebook cantata libretto cycle.

1733–1754
During this period, lasting from Sexagesima Sunday (15 February) to the fourth Sunday after Trinity (28 June), no concerted music was to be performed in church services. Johann Sebastian Bach used the period to compose his Mass for the Dresden court. He may have had the musicians of the Dresden court orchestra in mind when composing this extended setting: one of these musicians was its then-time concert master Pisendel, with whom Bach had been acquainted since before Stölzel had known him as concert master of Hoffmann's orchestra.

Early July 1733, Bach was still completing the composition, and the performance parts he intended to send to Dresden. Around this time, there are the earliest documented signs he used cantatas composed by Stölzel for performance in Leipzig. He may have performed two cantatas from Stölzel's Namebook cycle, for the fifth and sixth Sunday after Trinity, in July 1733: his copies of these cantatas date from around this time. He performed Stölzel's Ein Lämmlein geht und trägt die Schuld on Good Friday , and likely Stölzel's entire String-Music cantata cycle from 1735 to 1736. Around the same time, that is, likely somewhere between 1734 and 1740, Anna Magdalena Bach entered a version for voice and continuo of "", an aria from Stölzel's 1718 Diomedes opera, in her second notebook.

That was not the end of Bach's dealings with Stölzel's music: in the early 1740s he reworked an aria of Stölzel's Ein Lämmlein geht und trägt die Schuld to Bekennen will ich seinen Namen, BWV 200. Stölzel acquiring music composed by Bach is documented in 1747, when he bought a copy of Bach's Musical Offering for Gotha, less than a month after its publication. Both Stölzel and Bach joined Lorenz Christoph Mizler's exclusive : Stölzel in 1739, and Bach in 1746.

Text and music
In its 18th-century manuscripts "" is a da capo aria for soprano in E-flat major, in  time. Its lyrics also survive in the printed libretto of Stölzel's Diomedes opera:

Translations of the aria's text have been published, for instance, by Novello and by Alfred Music, and at The LiederNet Archive.

Stölzel's Diomedes

Two sources from the first quarter of the 18th century document text and music of Stölzel's Diomedes opera:
 A libretto printed for the first performance of the opera (16 November 1718 in Bayreuth).
The libretto specifies the performance venue as "", where only some of the more remarkable Bayreuth theatrical productions of the time were staged. The libretto names no composer. In his autobiography, Stölzel describes the opera as "". Also the 1720s manuscript copy of five arias mentions him as composer. Stölzel often wrote his own librettos. As far as known, the opera is his most extended composition: it contains over seventy arias, eight duets and six choruses, totalling over hundred movements.

The 1720s manuscript with the five arias does not name the instruments for which it is scored: these are assumed to be strings, that is violins (vl), viola (va) and basso continuo (bc). The soprano clef for the singer indicates a soprano voice for all arias. They are in different keys, and all of them are da capo arias. The fourth aria, that is "", is in E-flat major (although notated with only two flats at the clef), and has the most extended instrumentation: first violin (vl1), second violin (vl2), viola and continuo. It is also the only aria with a dynamics indicator:  (soft throughout). Apart from the second aria, which seems to be an addition to the 7th scene of the 3rd act, all texts of the five arias score correspond with passages of the libretto of 1718, thus the lyrics of these arias can be coupled with the characters of the dramatis personae of the opera.

Anna Magdalena Bach's Notenbüchlein

Anna Magdalena Wilcke was an accomplished vocalist when she married Johann Sebastian Bach in 1721, around which time she was hired as a singer by his employer at Köthen. A year later, her first notebook was started: it contains, as far as extant, only keyboard music, most of it written down by Johann Sebastian. The first entries in her second notebook were, like the first entries in Wilhelm Friedemann's 1720 notebook, keyboard compositions by Johann Sebastian, written down by the composer. In the 1725 notebook these are followed by around ten short keyboard pieces by various composers, among which Christian Petzold's Minuet in G major (BWV Anh. 114), written down by Anna Magdalena without composer indication. The next pieces, BWV 510–512, are the first compositions for singing that appear in Anna Magdalena's notebooks.

The pieces in Anna Magdalena's 1725 notebook were written down by eight different scribes, that is, apart from Johann Sebastian and Anna Magdalena, Carl Philipp Emanuel (the second son from Johann Sebastian's first marriage), two sons of Johann Sebastian and Anna Magdalena (Johann Christoph Friedrich and Johann Christian), Bernhard Dietrich Ludewig (known to have worked as a copyist of some choral works for Bach), and two further writers who have not been identified. Pieces were entered intermittently over a long period of time (e.g., Johann Christian was born in 1735), and their sequence in the manuscript does not reflect the chronology of when they were entered. The "Menuet fait par Mons. Böhm" (No. 21, entered by Johann Sebastian) is the only piece that is attributed to another composer in the manuscript.

Two objectives are apparent in Anna Magdalena's second notebook:
 it was used for instruction such as the musical education of Bach's younger sons, comparable to how Wilhelm Friedemann's  was in part used for the musical education of his eldest son.
 it contained , that is music to be performed in the family circle, such as most of the pieces that are still extant in Anna Magdalena's first notebook.

No. 25, "", BWV 508, belongs to the second category, along with another dozen pieces of vocal music in the 1725 notebook. Doubts about this attribution have however arisen regarding following arias and sacred songs:
 No. 12: "Gib dich zufrieden und sei stille" (BWV 510)
 No. 20: "So oft ich meine Tobackspfeife" (BWV 515) is possibly by Bach's son Gottfried Heinrich according to the 1998 edition of the BWV, but only attributed to the father at the Bach Digital website.
 No. 37: "Willst du dein Herz mir schenken" a.k.a. "Aria di G[i]ovannini" (BWV 518)
 No. 40: "Wie wohl ist mir, o Freund der Seelen" (BWV 517)
 No. 41: "Gedenke doch, mein Geist, zurücke" (BWV 509)

Apart from "", all compositions from the three notebooks (Wilhelm Friedemann's  and both of Anna Magdalena's notebooks) that have been positively identified as being originally composed by another composer than Bach are keyboard pieces.

In the notebook "" is entered on two non-consecutive pages: the first half of the aria is on page 75, and the second half is on page 78: in between, No. 26 on pages 76–77, is Anna Magdalena's copy of the aria of the Goldberg Variations. That copy of BWV 988/1 was written down no earlier than 1733–34, possibly even only in the 1740s.

Like in the five arias manuscript, the "" version in Anna Magdalena's notebook is in E-flat major, and uses a soprano clef for the singing voice. A difference in the notation is, however, that Anna Magdalena's manuscript uses three flats at the clef, which is the usual key signature for a composition in that key. Anna Magdalena likely copied her version from a score that used two flats at the clef. Apart from one measure in the second half of the composition, the melody for the singing voice is identical in both manuscripts. The continuo part of the BWV 508 version of "" is more lively and continuous in its voice leading than that of the extant orchestral version of the aria. The characteristics of the BWV 508 version (and of its extant manuscript), do not prove that Anna Magdalena's husband was the arranger of that version.

Reception

1860s–1940s
In 1866, a year after he had published his two-volume biography of Johann Sebastian Bach, Carl Hermann Bitter published six songs from Anna Magdalena's second , including "". Ernst Naumann published the aria separately in 1890, with a keyboard realisation of the accompaniment of his own hand. The  published "" twice, both in the voice and continuo version as found in Anna Magdalena's notebook:
In his preface, the editor names "" as one of the most beautiful songs he knows, and attributes it without doubt to Bach.
This editor is a bit more cautious when attributing the piece to Bach ("... könnte ... wohl eine Composition Johann Sebastian's sein" – ), while thinking it odd that the lyrics, which rather seem to be spoken by a male character, would be assigned to a female voice.

Also in 1894, Novello published Three Songs from Anna-Magdalena Bach's Notebooks, among which "", with an English translation. A story about Bach's family life, published in the same year for a youthful audience, describes the aria as especially captivating among the songs and dances of the notebooks. After the publication of several anthologies, all the pieces of the second notebook were published in a single volume in 1904. "" was recorded in 1906, sung by Blanche Marchesi.

Around 1915 Max Schneider discovered the orchestral version of "", along with four other arias by Stölzel, in an 18th-century manuscript at the library of the Sing-Akademie zu Berlin. At the time, this source was not further explored. In the 1920s the aria appeared in fictionalised biographical accounts:
 A 1924 story by  depicts Anna Magdalena starting to sing the aria when her husband returns home with the news that the Saxon Electress has died (1727).
 Esther Meynell's The Little Chronicle of Magdalena Bach (1925) pictures Anna Magdalena as overcome with emotion when she attempts to sing the aria.

Lotte Lehmann recorded "" in 1929. Singers who recorded the aria in the 1930s include Elisabeth Schumann, Paula Salomon-Lindberg and Jo Vincent. Richard Crooks sang "If Thou Be Near", an English-language version of the aria, on a recording that was released in 1938. Another English-language version, "Be Thou with me", was sung by Isobel Baillie on a war-time recording. During the Second World War, the archive of the Berlin Sing-Akademie went lost. Otto Klemperer's orchestral version of the aria was recorded in the 1940s.

1950s and later
In 1950 Wolfgang Schmieder listed "" as a composition by Bach in the first edition of the Bach-Werke-Verzeichnis, assigning it the number 508 in that catalogue. In 1957 the aria was published in the New Bach Edition, where its editor, Georg von Dadelsen, mentioned the lost orchestral version in the Critical Commentary volume. The 1998 edition of the Bach-Werke-Verzeichnis kept "" in the main catalogue (i.e. without moving it to the Anhang either of the doubtful or of the spurious works), but mentions it was based on a setting by Stölzel in an inaccessible source.

Recordings of the aria from the second half of the 20th century include:
 Elisabeth Schwarzkopf's 1954 recording at Abbey Road Studios with pianist Gerald Moore,

In 1999 the lost archive of the Sing-Akademie zu Berlin was recovered in Kyiv. Nonetheless the manuscript with the five Stölzel arias was still considered lost as late as 2006. That same year the manuscript was however described in a publication by the Bach Archive, edited by Wolfram Enßlin. In 2009 a full catalogue of the Sing-Akademie's archive was published, in which the manuscript containing the five arias by Stölzel is indicated as SA 808. By this time "" and the four other arias of the SA 808 manuscript were identified as belonging to Stölzel's opera Diomedes. The archive of the Sing-Akademie was transmitted to the Berlin State Library, which made a facsimile of the manuscript containing the Diomedes arias available on their website.

"" has become a very popular choice for wedding ceremonies and other such occasions. The question whether the perception and popularity of the piece would have been affected if it would have been identified as Stölzel's in an earlier stage remains unanswered.

21st-century recordings of "Bist du bei mir" include:
 A recording by Natalie Dessay and Rolando Villazón, with an accompaniment for piano, violins, and cello arranged by Philippe Rombi, for the 2005 film Joyeux Noël.
 A recording by Amira Willighagen on her second album, Merry Christmas (2015), at eleven years of age.

References

Sources

External links 
 
 Bist du bei mir, BWV 508: performance by the Netherlands Bach Society (video and background information)
 
 
 "Bist du bei mir", details, including sheet music
 "Bist du bei mir" at the Mutopia Project
 , Elisabeth Schwarzkopf, Gerald Moore, Angel Records 35023
 RISM: 469080810

1718 compositions
1725 compositions
Bach: spurious and doubtful works
Arias in German
Soprano arias